The Martina Franca–Lecce railway is an Italian  long railway line, that connects Martina Franca with Francavilla Fontana and Lecce.

The line was opened in four stages between 1907 and 1925.  On 27 May 1907 the section from Lecce to Francavilla Fontana opened; the line was further extended on 14 August 1924 to Ceglie Messapica. On 5 April 1925 the line reached Cisternino and finally reached Martina Franca on 24 December 1925.

Usage
The line is used by the following service(s):

Local services (Treno regionale) Martina Franca - Francavilla Fontana - Novoli - Lecce

See also 
 List of railway lines in Italy

References

This article is based upon a translation of the Italian language version as at September 2014.

External links 

Railway lines in Apulia
Railway lines opened in 1907